Sri Mohan Kumar Kondajji is a member of the Karnataka Pradesh Congress Committee (KPCC) in the Indian state of Karnataka.
He is the former spokesman of the Karnataka Pradesh Congress Committee (KPCC). He is also an ex-officio member of the Karnataka State Pollution Control Board. He is also the jury member of National Film Awards – 2003.

References

Indian National Congress politicians from Karnataka
Living people
Year of birth missing (living people)